Mucha Calidad is the first and only studio album by duo Nova & Jory released through Millones Records on July 12, 2011.

Track listing

Bonus track

Pre-releases
Prior to the release of Mucha Calidad, two albums were released in 2010 in two volumes titled Mucha Calidad Pre-Album Mixtape  and Mucha Calidad Pre-Album Mixtape Vol. 2

Volume 1
"Mucha Calidad" – Pacho & Cirilo feat. va & Jory, Ñengo Flow, Franco "El Gorila", Delirious, Chyno Nyno, Wibal & Alex 
"Bien Loco" – va & Jory
"Boom Boom (Remix)" – Magnate & Valentino feat. va & Jory, J. Álvarez
"Bésame" – va & Jory
"Sexo" – va & Jory 
"Yo Sé Que Quieres" – Alexis & Fido feat. va & Jory 
"Háblame Claro" – va & Jory feat. Ñengo Flow, Randy Glock 
"Ojitos Achinao’" – va 09. Somos Dos – va & Jory 
"Adivina Qué" – va & Jory Ft. Yomo 
"Las 3 J’s" – Jory, J. Álvarez, Juno "The HitMaker" 
"Pata-Boom" – Daddy Yankee feat. Jory 
"Hola Beba (Remix)" – Farruko feat. Jory, J. Álvarez 
"La Calle Es Pa' Hombre" – va feat. Ñengo Flow, Yomo, Randy Glock, Getto 
"Bésame (Remix)" – va & Jory feat. R.K.M. & Ken-Y 
"La che Perfecta" – va & Jory
"Un Poco Más" – va & Jory 
"Todas Las Solteras" – Gocho Ft. Jory, Ñengo Flow

Volume 2
"Un Poko Más" 
"La Noche Perfecta" 
"Somos Dos" 
"Una Carta" - feat. Cilenzio 
"Musica En High" - feat. Berto 'El Original' 
"A La Buena O A La Mala" -  feat. Jayko Pa' 
"Corte De Rebulera" 
"Por Que Tú Eres Mi Nena" - feat. John Jay 
"Deja" - feat. J Alvarez & Ñejo & Dalmata 
"Dartelo Hoy" - feat. Amaretto
"Ven Pa' Ca' Bebe - feat. Lulo 
"En EL Barrio Se Sabe Todo" - feat. Algenis 
"Que Descanses En Paz (R.I.P. Pacho)" - feat. Ñenego Flow 
"Kito" - feat. Jory – "Juegos Nada Mas" 
"La Bemba" - feat. Onix & Rokawan 
"Besame (Remix) - feat. Marvin, Jomar, Wibal & Alex, J Alvarez & Más 
"Berto 'Ex-Trebol' - feat. Nova, Jomar, Randy Glock – "Por Esto Me He Jodio" 
"La Vida Es Corta" - feat. Yomo & Randy Glock 
"Ñengo Flow" - feat. John Jay, Chyno Nyno, Jory & Delirious – "No Hay Ley"

Reggaeton albums
2011 debut albums